Cambio is the Spanish word for "change", and may refer to:

Publications
Cambio (magazine), a Colombian political magazine
Cambio (newspaper), a Bolivian newspaper

Entertainment and games
Cambio (band), a Filipino band
Perissone Cambio, 16th century musician
Built By Girls, formerly known as Cambio.com, an online news/entertainment website (AOL brand) 
Cambio (card game), early name for the popular Swedish game of Kille
Cabo (game), a modern card game sometimes known as Cambio

Other
Cambio 90, a Peruvian political party
Currency exchange, term associated with exchanging one currency for another
Cambio Healthcare Systems, a Swedish healthcare company

See also
Cambia (disambiguation)